The MCV Evolution (stylised as eVolution; internal designation: MCV C102) is a low floor and low entry single-decker bus body built by Manufacturing Commercial Vehicles. It was unveiled in 2003 as the successor to the MCV Stirling. The MCV Evolution 2 (internal designation: MCV C124RLE) was launched, initially on Mercedes-Benz chassis in 2011.

Description and use 
The MCV Evolution is based on the Stirling that it has a rounded roof dome (no longer peaked) and a separately mounted destination display with either a double-curvature windscreen or a single-curvature windscreen and it is offered on the MAN 12.220 (A76), 12.240 (A76), 14.220 (A66) and 14.240 (A66) however there were plans to body on an even shorter MAN chassis, the 10.220, which can be built as short as 8.5m long.

From late 2005 it was offered on the Alexander Dennis Dart SLF. In October 2009, MCV and dealer Arriva Bus & Coach unveiled a MCV Evolution VDL SB180 at Coach and Bus Live 2009.

The MCV Evolution was also offered on larger full-size single-decker buses, such as the Volvo B7RLE, Volvo B8RLE, MAN A22 and Mercedes-Benz OC500LE; this was replaced by the long-wheelbase MCV Evora in 2018, although the Evolution 2 remains in production on shorter, more lightweight chassis.

One Evolution body was built on VDL SB200 chassis in 2012 as a static demonstrator for Arriva Bus & Coach, two years later it was sold to Richards Brothers in Wales.

Transport for London contractors Docklands Buses and Metroline both purchased examples, while Tranzit Group of New Zealand purchased 58. Go Bus of New Zealand currently operates 43 of the type, 31 being the 15.250 MAN chassis and the remaining 12 being 14.240 MAN chassis. 

The original Evolution body is internally designated by MCV as the C102 on Alexander Dennis, MAN, VDL, and Volvo chassis and as the C120LE on Mercedes-Benz chassis, while the Evolution 2 body is internally designated as the C124RLE on Mercedes-Benz and Volvo chassis and as the C130RLE on MAN chassis.

Gallery

References

External links

Low-floor buses
Low-entry buses
Midibuses
Full-size buses
Vehicles introduced in 2003